A train wheel or rail wheel is a type of wheel specially designed for use on railway tracks. The wheel acts as a rolling component, typically press fitted onto an axle and mounted directly on a railway carriage or locomotive, or indirectly on a bogie (in the UK), also called a truck (in North America). The powered wheels under the locomotive are called driving wheels. Wheels are initially cast or forged and then heat-treated to have a specific hardness. New wheels are machined using a lathe to a standardized shape, called a profile, before being installed onto an axle. All wheel profiles are regularly checked to ensure proper interaction between the wheel and the rail. Incorrectly profiled wheels and worn wheels can increase rolling resistance, reduce energy efficiency and may even cause a derailment.

Wheel geometry and flange

Almost all train wheels have a straight projection, a flange, on one side to keep the wheels, and hence the train, running on the rails when the limits or tests of alignment are reached: when a bend is taken at appropriate speed, when there are strong sidebreezes, and to withstand e.g. most common emergent defects in trackbed, rail and mild debris. See Hunting oscillation. The running surface of most is conical, serving as the primary means of keeping the train's motion aligned with the track (the wheels are fixed on their axles, and as the mass of the train pushes it towards the outside of the curve, the outside wheel rides up to contact the rail at a larger diameter while the inside wheel drops down to contact its rail at a smaller diameter, travelling a smaller distance for each rotation of the axle, and steering the train round the curve). But sometimes wheels are cylindrical, such that the flanges are essential to keep the train on the rail track.

Wheel arrangement

The number of wheels per locomotive or car varies in both size and number to accommodate the needs of the railcar or locomotive. Regardless of these factors, pairs of identically sized wheels are always affixed to a straight axle as a singular unit, called a wheelset.

Wheels for road-rail vehicles

Wheels used for road–rail vehicles are normally smaller than those found on other types of rolling stock (such as locomotives or carriages). In Australia, wheels for road-rail vehicles should comply with the requirements of AS7514.4, which is the Australian standard for infrastructure maintenance vehicle wheels.

Railway wheel and tire

Modern railway wheels are usually machined from a single casting, also known as monoblock wheels. Some wheels, however, are made of two parts: the wheel core, and a tire ("tyre" in British English, Australian English and other variants) around the perimeter. Separate tires are a component of some modern passenger rolling stock. The purpose of the separate tire is to provide a replaceable wearing element – an important factor for steam locomotives with their costly spoked construction. In modern times the tire is invariably made from steel, which is stronger than the cast iron of earlier eras. It is typically heated and pressed on to the wheel before it cools and shrinks. Resilient rail wheels have a resilient material, such as rubber, between the wheel and tire. Failure of such kind of wheel was one of the causes leading up to the Eschede high-speed train crash.

Causes of damage

The most common cause of wheel damage is severe braking. This activity includes sudden braking, braking on steep gradients and braking with high weight loads. The brake shoes (or blocks) are applied directly to the wheel surface which generates immense amounts of thermal energy. Under severe braking conditions, the generated thermal energy can contribute to thermal shock or alteration of the wheel's mechanical properties. Ultimately, acute thermal loading leads to a phenomenon called spalling. Alternatively, severe braking or low adhesion may stop the rotation of the wheels while the vehicle is still moving, which may cause a flat spot on the wheel-rail interface and localized heat damage.

Modern railway wheels are manufactured reasonably thick to provide an allowance of wear material. Worn wheels or wheels with a flat spot are machined on a wheel lathe if there is sufficient thickness of material remaining.

Guide wheel 
Rubber-tyred metros with a central guide rail, such as the Busan Metro, Lille Metro and the Sapporo Municipal Subway as well as rubber-tyred trams have guide wheels.

See also
 Adhesive weight
 Cycloid 
 Wheelset (rail transport)#Conical wheel-tread

References

ISO 1005 Parts 1-9
BS 5892 Parts 1-6
AS7414.4

External links 
 
 Train wheels